Kachanivka is a rural settlement (a selyshche) in Pryluky Raion, Chernihiv Oblast (province) of Ukraine. It belongs to Parafiivka settlement hromada, one of the hromadas of Ukraine.

Until 18 July 2020, Kachanivka was located in Ichnia Raion. The raion was abolished on 18 July 2020 as part of the administrative reform of Ukraine, which reduced the number of raions of Chernihiv Oblast to five.

References 

Rural settlements in Chernihiv Oblast